Michael Joseph Kay (born 9 December 1989 in Consett, England) is an English former footballer. He usually played in the right back position, but could also play as a central defender and has been known to fill in as a left back on occasion. He is a former England Under-17 international. He is no relation to former Sunderland defender John Kay. He is now an engineer at openreach working as a cabler on fnd fibre build.

Club career
Kay joined Sunderland's academy at 7 years of age and progressed through the ranks before making his professional debut on 4 February 2009 against Blackburn Rovers in a FA Cup 4th Round Replay. He regularly captained Sunderland's reserve team during the 2009–10 season.

On 30 September 2010 he joined Gateshead on a one-month loan deal. On 2 October, Kay scored on his Gateshead debut against Mansfield Town at Gateshead International Stadium. On 26 October, it was announced that Gateshead had extended Kay's loan for a further 28 days.

On 6 January 2011 he went on another loan, this time for a month at Tranmere Rovers and made his club debut on 8 January against Walsall. On 7 April Sunderland announced that he was amongst eight players to be released at the end of the season. He scored his first goal for Tranmere Rovers on 25 April 2011 in a 4–0 win over Exeter City.

At the end of the 2010–11 season he was offered a contract by Tranmere and it has been reported by local media that he has accepted this deal. In the summer of 2013, he joined Chester.

Career statistics

Club

A.  The "League" column constitutes appearances and goals (including those as a substitute) in The Football League and Football Conference.
B.  The "Other" column constitutes appearances and goals (including those as a substitute) in the FA Trophy, Football League Trophy, Cheshire Senior Cup and play-offs.

References

External links
Michael Kay's player profile at SAFC.com

Living people
1989 births
Sportspeople from Consett
Footballers from County Durham
English footballers
England youth international footballers
Sunderland A.F.C. players
Gateshead F.C. players
National League (English football) players
Tranmere Rovers F.C. players
Chester F.C. players
English Football League players
Association football defenders